Pa-ye Astan (also Romanized as Pā-ye Āstān, Pā Āsetān, Pāy Āsetān, and Pa yi Āstān) is a village in Kunani Rural District, Kunani District, Kuhdasht County, Lorestan Province, Iran. At the 2006 census, its population was 259, in 53 families.

References 

Towns and villages in Kuhdasht County